Chanda Rubin and Sandrine Testud were the defending champions, but Testud could not compete this year after suffering a stress fracture in her rib during the 2000 Summer Olympics. Rubin teamed up with Magüi Serna and lost in first round to Alexandra Fusai and Nathalie Tauziat.

Martina Hingis and Anna Kournikova won the title by defeating Arantxa Sánchez Vicario and Barbara Schett 6–4, 6–2 in the final.

Seeds

Draw

Draw

References

External links
 Official results archive (ITF)
 Official results archive (WTA)

Porsche Tennis Grand Prix Doubles
2000 Women's Doubles